The 50th Annual TV Week Logie Awards was held on Sunday 4 May 2008 at the Crown Palladium in Melbourne, and broadcast on the Nine Network. For the first time in the Logie Awards 50-year history, there was no host for the ceremony, but only a series of presenters. Also for the first time, the public were able to vote online for the "Most Popular" categories without needing to buy a copy of TV Week. The nominations were announced on 7 April 2008. Hamish Blake and Andy Lee were the backstage hosts, while Jules Lund, Livinia Nixon and Shelley Craft were the red carpet arrivals hosts.

Winners and nominees
In the tables below, winners are listed first and highlighted in bold.

Gold Logie

Acting/Presenting

Most Popular Programs

Most Outstanding Programs

Performers
Top 10 finalists from So You Think You Can Dance Australia
The Last Goodnight – "Pictures of You"
Westlife – "Something Right"
Vanessa Amorosi – "Perfect"
Chris Lilley as Mr G – "Naughty Girl"

Hall of Fame
John Clarke became the 25th inductee into the TV Week Logies Hall of Fame.

References

External links
 

2008
2008 television awards
2008 in Australian television
2008 awards in Australia